LetDownCrush is the third studio album by 16volt, released on August 7, 1996 by Cargo and Re-Constriction Records.

Reception

AllMusic awarded LetDownCrush three out of five possible stars. Aiding & Abetting gave the album a mixed review as well, calling LetDownCrush "diverse, and while obviously not a live-to-tape session, more immediate-sounding" and praised the songs for being "tight and vicious." Alternative Press gave the album a positive review, saying "Hard beats dominate, and beefy guitar plays right into them, maximizing their power to make you wig." Black Monday noted the band's artistic progression in combining the song structure of Skin with the electronics of Wisdom but criticized the metal influences. Sonic Boom lauded Eric Powell's musical maturation and said "the best musical elements from all of his previous work appear like a trail of footprints down well trod path which ends at the edge of a precipice."

Track listing

Accolades

Personnel
Adapted from the LetDownCrush liner notes.

16volt
 Marc LaCorte – guitar, programming
 Eric Powell – lead vocals, programming, guitar, production, engineering, editing, recording (3, 7, 9), mixing (4)

Addition performers
 Bryan Barton – loops (8)
 Stella Katsoudas – vocals (1)
 Dan Pred – live drums (3)
 Ed Tinley (10)
 William Tucker – additional guitar (10), lead guitar (5)

Production and design
 Dave Friedlander – engineering, mixing (7, 9)
 Bill Garcelon – engineering
 Matt Gibson – engineering
 Zlatko Hukic – engineering
 Jon Irish – engineering, recording (1, 2, 5, 6, 8), mixing (4)
 Rick McMillen – mastering
 Esther Nevarez – engineering
 Jeff "Critter" Newell – production, engineering, mixing (1, 2, 5, 6, 8), recording (3, 7, 9)
 Jordan Nogood – design
 Ed Tinley – engineering

Release history

References

External links 
 
 LetDownCrush at Bandcamp
 

1996 albums
16volt albums
Cargo Music albums
Metropolis Records albums
Re-Constriction Records albums